Today's Zaman (Zaman is Turkish for 'time' or 'age') was an English-language daily newspaper based in Turkey. Established on 17 January 2007, it was the English-language edition of the Turkish daily Zaman. Today's Zaman included domestic and international coverage, and regularly published topical supplements. Its contributors included cartoonist Cem Kızıltuğ.

On 4 March 2016, a state administrator was appointed to run Zaman as well as Today's Zaman. Since a series of corruption investigations went public on 17 December 2013 which targeted high ranking government officials, the Turkish government has been putting pressure on media organizations that are critical of it.

, the website of Today's Zaman had not been updated since 5 March, while all archived articles prior to March 2016 were removed.

On July 20, 2016, five days after the military coup attempt, Today's Zaman was shut down after an executive decree by President Recep Tayyip Erdogan; arrest warrants were issued for 47 former staff. Zaman was described by an official as the “flagship media organization” of the Gülen-led movement. CNBC described the newspaper as "what used to be Turkey’s number one English daily" before its shutdown.

References

External links
  
 
 Archive version of the site, with March 2016 content

Newspapers published in Istanbul
English-language newspapers published in Turkey
Defunct newspapers published in Turkey
2007 establishments in Turkey
Publications established in 2007
Mass media shut down in the 2016 Turkish purges
2016 disestablishments in Turkey
Publications disestablished in 2016
Daily newspapers published in Turkey
Banned newspapers